USS K-4 (SS-35) was a K-class submarine built for the United States Navy during the 1910s.

Description
They displaced  on the surface and  submerged. The K-class submarines had a crew of 2 officers and 26 enlisted men.

For surface running, the boats were powered by two  NELSECO diesel engines, each driving one propeller shaft. When submerged each propeller was driven by a  electric motor. They could reach  on the surface and  underwater.

The K-class submarines were armed with four 18 inch (450 mm)  torpedo tubes in the bow. They carried four reloads, for a total of eight torpedoes.

Construction and career
The boat was laid down by the Moran Company in Seattle, Washington, as Walrus, making her the first ship of the United States Navy to be named for the walrus, a gregarious, aquatic mammal related to the seal found in Arctic waters, but on 17 November 1911 she was renamed K-4.  She was launched on 19 March 1914 sponsored by Mrs. James P. Olding, wife of the commanding officer, and commissioned on 24 October 1914.

Joining the Pacific Torpedo Flotilla, K-4 operated along the coast of California, conducting constant exercises and experiments to develop the techniques of submarine warfare. From 14 October 1915 to 31 October 1917, she carried out similar operations in the Hawaiian Islands.  When the United States's involvement in World War I called for increased naval activity, K-4 departed Hawaii for service out of Key West, Florida, arriving 9 January 1918. For the rest of the war, she remained at Key West, where she patrolled the Florida peninsula. After the Armistice with Germany of 11 November 1918, K-4 operated along the East Coast training officers and men for duty in submarines. She continued these duties for four years before arriving at Hampton Roads, Virginia, on 24 March 1923.  K-4 decommissioned there 10 May 1923 and was sold as scrap on 3 June 1931.

Notes

References

External links
 

United States K-class submarines
World War I submarines of the United States
Ships built in Seattle
1914 ships